Sir Robert Parning (or Parving) (died 26 August 1343) was an English lawyer and administrator.

Life
The son of Robert Parning of Cumberland, he was five times knight of the shire in Parliament for his native Cumberland (1325, 1327, 1328, 1331 and 1332).

He became serjeant-at-law in 1329 and served as King's Serjeant from 1333 to 1339 and Chief Justice of the King's Bench from 1340 to 1341. He was Treasurer from January to October 1341  and Chancellor from 1341 to 1343. He was knighted in 1340.

Family
Parning was married to Isabel, but had no surviving sons. When he died in London in 1343 his inheritance was divided up between his two sisters.

See also
 List of Lord Chancellors and Lord Keepers
 List of Lord High Treasurers

References

Sources
Kingsford, C. L., 'Parning, Sir Robert (d. 1343)', rev. W. M. Ormrod, Oxford Dictionary of National Biography, Oxford University Press, 2004 , accessed 8 Aug 2006. 
Powicke, F. Maurice and E. B. Fryde Handbook of British Chronology 2nd. ed. London:Royal Historical Society 1961

Year of birth unknown
1343 deaths
Lord chief justices of England and Wales
Lord chancellors of England
Lord High Treasurers of England
Justices of the Common Pleas
English MPs 1325
14th-century English judges
English MPs 1327
English MPs 1328
English MPs 1331
English MPs 1332